Heinrich Dumoulin, S.J. (31 May 1905 – 21 July 1995) was a Jesuit theologian, a widely published author on Zen, and a professor of philosophy and history at Sophia University in Tokyo, where he was Professor Emeritus. He was the founder of its Institute for Oriental Religions, as well as the first Director of the Nanzan Institute for Religion and Culture.

He was born in Rhineland, Germany, and ordained as a Jesuit priest in 1933. In 1935, he was sent to Japan on missions under the guidance of Fr. Hugo Enomiya-Lassalle, where he became fluent in the Shinto religion and Buddhism.

He died in 1995 at the age of 90.

Bibliography
The Development of Chinese Zen After the Sixth Patriarch in the Light of the Mumonkan (1953, First Zen Institute of America)
A History of Zen Buddhism (1963, Pantheon Books)
Christianity Meets Buddhism (1974, Open Court Publishing)
Buddhism in the Modern World (1976, Macmillan Publishing)
Zen Enlightenment: Origins and Meaning (1979, Weatherhill)
Zen Buddhism in the Twentieth Century (1992)
Understanding Buddhism: Key Themes (1994), Weatherhill
Zen Buddhism: A History; Volume 1 India and China, (2005, World Wisdom)
Zen Buddhism: A History; Volume 2 Japan, (2005, World Wisdom)

References

External links
 Heinrich Dumoulin - Life and Work

Zen Buddhism writers
German Buddhists
20th-century German Jesuits
1905 births
1995 deaths
German Roman Catholic missionaries
Jesuit missionaries in Japan
German emigrants to Japan
Missionary educators
Academic staff of Sophia University